The 1943–44 season was Manchester United's fifth season in the non-competitive War League during the Second World War.

Many of Manchester United's players went off to fight in the war, but for those who remained, the Football League organised a special War League.

War League North Regional League First Championship

War League North Regional League Second Championship

Pld = Matches played; W = Matches won; D = Matches drawn; L = Matches lost; GF = Goals for; GA = Goals against; Pts = Points

References

Manchester United F.C. seasons
Manchester United